The Women's 200m breaststroke event at the 2010 South American Games was held on March 28, with the heats at 10:36 and the Final at 18:05.

Medalists

Records

Results

Heats

Final

References
Heats
Final

Breaststroke 200m W